George Dames Burtchaell,  KC, MA, LLB, MRIA, JP (12 June 1853 – 18 August 1921) was an Irish genealogist.

Education
Burtchaell was educated at Kilkenny College and Trinity College, Dublin.

Career
Barrister King's Inns, 1879
 KC 1918
 Fellow, Royal Society of Antiquaries of Ireland, 1891
 Assistant Secretary and Treasurer, Royal Society of Antiquaries of Ireland 1899
 Vice-President, Royal Society of Antiquaries of Ireland 1909–14 
 Athlone Pursuivant of Arms, 1908
 Member of Council of Royal Irish Academy, 1915–18
 Deputy Ulster King of Arms, 1910–11

Works
 "Alumni Dublinenses : a register of the students, graduates, professors and provosts of Trinity College, Dublin, 1593–1860": Dublin : A. Thom & Co., 1935 ( with Thomas Sadleir)
 "Genealogical Memoirs of the members of parliament for the county and city of Kilkenny from the earliest on record to the present time; and for the boroughs of Callan, Thomastown, Inistioge, Gowran, St. Canice or Irishtown, and Knocktopher, from their enfranchisement to the Union" Dublin : Sealy & Co., 1888
 "The Knights of England: a complete record from the earliest time to the present day of the knights of all the Orders of Chivalry in England, Scotland and Ireland, and of Knights Bachelors Incorporating a complete list of Knights Bachelors dubbed in Ireland": London : Sherratt & Hughes, 1906 (with William Arthur Shaw)

References

External links
 National Library of Ireland, nli.ie. Accessed 19 December 2022.
 Brief biography of Peter Burtchaell, his architect brother, dia.ie. Accessed 19 December 2022.

Irish justices of the peace
Irish genealogists
People educated at Kilkenny College
Alumni of Trinity College Dublin
1853 births
1921 deaths